Benjamin Franklin Register Jr.  (10 June 1930 – 5 August 2019) was a lieutenant general in the United States Army. His assignments included Deputy Chief of Staff for Logistics. Register was commissioned as a distinguished military graduate from the Georgia Institute of Technology in 1951, and served until his retirement in 1987. He earned a B.S. degree in industrial management from Georgia Tech and later earned an M.S. degree in military logistics management from the Air Force Institute of Technology.

After his death, Register was interred at Fort Mitchell National Cemetery in Alabama on 8 August 2019.

References

1930 births
2019 deaths
People from Columbus, Georgia
Georgia Tech alumni
United States Army personnel of the Korean War
Air Force Institute of Technology alumni
United States Army personnel of the Vietnam War
Recipients of the Meritorious Service Medal (United States)
Recipients of the Legion of Merit
United States Army generals
People from Opelika, Alabama